"It's Goin' Down" is a song by American turntablists the X-Ecutioners. It features two members of American rock band Linkin Park, rapper Mike Shinoda and turntablist Joe Hahn. It is often mistaken for a Linkin Park track due to their involvement. It was released as the only single from The X-Ecutioners' second studio album Built from Scratch, which was originally released on February 26, 2002. The single was released in March 2002 in CD and vinyl format.

Background
While the song is foremost credited to the X-Ecutioners, it was written and performed primarily by Shinoda and Hahn of the band Linkin Park. It was also produced by Shinoda. The song includes samples of the Xzibit song "Year 2000" and Linkin Park's demo tracks "Step Up" (originally from the original and reissue of the EP Hybrid Theory) and "Dedicated (Demo 1999)" (originally from the LP Underground 2.0 EP). The chorus and bridge of the song both refer to the group as "X-Men", an old name that they changed in order to avoid accusations of copyright infringement.

"It's Goin' Down" peaked at number seven on the UK Singles Chart and number 28 in Australia. In the US, it reached number 85 on the Billboard Hot 100, number 13 on the Hot Modern Rock Tracks chart  and number 29 on the Hot Mainstream Rock Tracks chart.

The song also samples Linkin Park songs on two occasions during the intro. First being "Watch them flee/Hip hop heads", which comes from the track "Dedicated (Demo 1999)". The second is a sample saying, "You do it like this," which is from "Step Up". Linkin Park performed "It's Goin' Down" often between 2002 and 2004. They also collaborated with American rapper Snoop Dogg in one performance in which he said a few verses from "Gin and Juice".

History
In an article from Resident Advisor, the song has been carefully described as "a rap rock style to expect from Linkin Park being taken into the X-Ecution chamber, ready to be finally cut up, getting a lot of the JJJ play already, and is quite a decent track with a pretty average and flowless rap from Shinoda." An instrumental version of "It's Goin' Down" on the 12-inch vinyl format is included in the single itself.

Music video
The music video for "It's Goin' Down" also features Linkin Park's Rob Bourdon on drums, Dave Farrell on bass, and Static-X guitarist and frontman Wayne Static on guitar, although they were not involved in the recording of the song. Linkin Park guitarist Brad Delson and late lead vocalist Chester Bennington also made a cameo appearance, as well as other well-known musicians such as Xzibit, Kris Kohls & Mike Ransom of Adema & DJ Babu of Dilated Peoples.

Track listing

Charts

Weekly charts

Year-end charts

References

Linkin Park songs
2002 singles
Songs written by Mike Shinoda
Songs written by Xzibit
Nu metal songs
Rap metal songs
2001 songs
Loud Records singles
Columbia Records singles